was a town located in Sakai District, Fukui Prefecture, Japan.

The town of Sakai had a population of 12,953 at the 2005 national census, an increase of 181 (1.4%) from the 2000 census. The total area was 31.70 km² and population density was 408.61 persons per km².

The name Sakai-chō is still used within the postal address of locations within the former town.

References

External links
 Sakai city official website 

Dissolved municipalities of Fukui Prefecture
Sakai, Fukui